Ten Months (Korean: 십개월의 미래; RR: Sibgaewol Mirae; lit. The Future of Ten Months) is a 2020 South Korean pregnancy drama film written and directed by Nam Koong-sun in her directorial debut starring Choi Sung-eun. The film is a feature project from the Korea National University of Arts (K'Arts) that debuted in the Korean Cinema Section of the Jeonju International Film Festival on May 28, 2020. The film was released domestically in South Korea on October 14, 2021.

Synopsis 
29-year-old game developer, Mirae (Choi Sung-eun) suddenly realizes that she is 11 weeks pregnant. She tells her boyfriend, and his immediate response is to say that they should get married. A vegetarian, the boyfriend is forced to work on his parents' pig farm to ensure that they get the support they need. Meanwhile, when Mirae's boss finds out about the pregnancy, all the hard work she has put into her career comes tumbling down.

Cast 

 Choi Sung-eun as Choi Mi-rae
 Baek Hyun-jin as Ong-joong
 Seo Young-joo as Yoon-ho
 Yoo Eden as Kim-kim
 Kwon Ah-reum as Kang-mi
 Son Sung-chan as Hong-seon
 Kim Geun-young as Soon-ja
 Oh Tae-eun as Eun-ok
 Song Kyung-eui as Seong-tae
 Go Young-chan as Hyeon-jae
 Bang Joo-hwan as Chang-soo

Production 
Director Nam Koong-sun shared in an interview that the film was first envisioned in 2015 but it was only in 2018 when the screenplay was picked up as an independent feature project from the Korea National University of Arts (K'Arts).

Release 
The film was first premiered at the 21st Jeonju International Film Festival under the Korean Cinema Section held from May 28 to September 20, 2020. The film also became available for a fee on OTT platform Wave from May 28 to June 6, 2020.

It was invited at the 20th New York Asian Film Festival and was the only Korean film featured in the competitive category, 'Uncaged Section' and screened at Lincoln Center and SVA Theatre in the two-week festival held from August 6 to 22, 2021 in New York. Ten Months was also invited to premiere at the 41st Hawaii International Film Festival's 'Spotlight on Korea' section held from November 4 - November 28, 2021. The same year, it was also invited to the 'Paysage section' of the 16th Paris Korean Film Festival held in Paris, France for 8 days from October 26 to November 2,2021.

The film was theatrically released on October 14, 2021.

Box office 
The film had a cumulative admission of 15,431 audiences.

Reception 
Going by Korean review aggregator Naver Movie Database, the film holds an approval rating of 7.6 from the audience. 

Lee Jae-lim of Korea JoongAng Daily wrote that the film drew similarities to “Kim Ji Young, Born 1982,” by diving into the lives of Korean women, specifically in as Mi-rae grapples with various obstacles that arise throughout her pregnancy even further stating that the film  should be designated as a mandatory part of Korea's sex education. Lee "...found the narrative where Mi-rae suddenly decides to accept motherhood came somewhat out of the blue..."  but stating "Nevertheless, I would like to give a standing ovation to the lead actor Choi Sung-eun who portrayed Mi-rae, a rookie actor who debuted through the film “Start-Up” last year."

Awards and nominations

References

External links
 
 
 
 
 

2020 films
2020s Korean-language films
South Korean drama films
2020 directorial debut films
2020s pregnancy films